Artturi Tienari (31 October 1907 in Kuru – 26 April 1998) was a Finnish Civil Guard officer, business executive and politician. He was a member of the Parliament of Finland from 1954 to 1957, representing the People's Party of Finland.

References

1907 births
1998 deaths
People from Ylöjärvi
People from Häme Province (Grand Duchy of Finland)
People's Party of Finland (1951) politicians
Members of the Parliament of Finland (1954–58)